Onehunga Mata'uiau-Esau (born 9 November 1975 in Apia) is a Samoan former rugby union player and coach. He played as a hooker. As of April 2015, he coaches Central Queensland

Career
His first international cap was during a match against Tonga, at Apia, on 13 July 1996. He was part of 1999 Rugby World Cup roster, where he played 3 matches. His last international cap was against Scotland, at Murrayfield, on 18 November 2000.
He also played the NPC for Hawke's Bay.

References

External links

Onehunga Matauiau-Esau at New Zealand Rugby History

1975 births
Living people
Sportspeople from Apia
Samoan rugby union coaches
Samoan rugby union players
Samoan expatriates in New Zealand
Samoan expatriates in Australia
Rugby union hookers
Samoa international rugby union players